The following radio stations broadcast on FM frequency 102.0 MHz:

Africa
 Radio Okapi in Matadi, Congo

Bulgaria
 N-JOY in Plovdiv

China 
 CNR Music Radio in Chenzhou
 CRI Voice of the South China Sea in Qionghai

France
 Vibration in Nogent-le-Rotrou and Orléans

Indonesia
 Prambors FM in Semarang, Central Java

India
 AIR FM Rainbow in Visakhapatnam

Ireland
 Beat 102 103 in North Wexford, South Carlow and Kilkenny
 CUH FM Hospital Radio in Cork University Hospital, Cork, County Cork

Israel
 Kol HaYam HaAdom in Eilat

Latvia
 European Hit Radio in Madona

Malaysia
 Era in Tapah, Bidor, Chenderiang and Trolak, Perak
 Manis FM in Kuala Terengganu, Terengganu

Morocco
 Luxe Radio in Essaouira

Spain
 Radio Nacional in Logroño

United Kingdom
 Capital Manchester and Lancashire in Manchester
 Capital Mid-Counties in Stratford-upon-Avon
 Drystone Radio in Wharfedale
 Greatest Hits Radio East in Ipswich and Suffolk
 Heart Sussex in Hastings
 Isle of Wight Radio in Cowes, Ventnor and Ryde
 Pure Radio Scotland in Dundee

References

Lists of radio stations by frequency